A number of steamships have been named Oakley, including:

, 987 GRT coaster, in service 1947–53
, 8,129 GRT tanker, in service 1952–62

Ship names